Veitchia winin is a species of flowering plant in the family Arecaceae. It is found only in Vanuatu.

References

winin
Trees of Vanuatu
Endemic flora of Vanuatu